For the baseball player of the same name, see Dave Eiland

David Eiland (born in St. Louis, Missouri) is a musician, composer, recording artist and producer. Eiland is a multi-instrumentalist playing saxophones, guitar, bass, drums, Aerophone, Lyricon and EWI amongst other instruments.

Biography 
David Eiland has enjoyed a successful career in the music business for over 35 years. In the 1970s he was member in a variety of bands in the Twin Cities, he was also a founding member of the funk band Flyte Tyme. Throughout his career Eiland has recorded and performed with national artists such as Janet Jackson, David Bowie, Human League, Jonny Lang, Thelma Houston, Alexander O'Neal, Baby and The Pacifiers, and Cherrelle. He also worked as a staff member for Flyte Tyme Productions.

Awards 
Eiland won Brass/Reed Player of the Year at the 1995 MMA Awards.

References

External links 
 

Living people
American male saxophonists
Musicians from St. Louis
Musicians from Minnesota
Year of birth missing (living people)
21st-century American saxophonists
21st-century American male musicians